Karl Buhl (born 21 January 1940) is a German cross-country skier. He competed at the 1964 Winter Olympics and the 1968 Winter Olympics.

References

External links
 

1940 births
Living people
German male cross-country skiers
Olympic cross-country skiers of the United Team of Germany
Olympic cross-country skiers of West Germany
Cross-country skiers at the 1964 Winter Olympics
Cross-country skiers at the 1968 Winter Olympics
People from Sonthofen
Sportspeople from Swabia (Bavaria)